...And Other Officials is a 1976 Soviet drama film directed by Semyon Aranovich.

Plot 
A trade agreement between a Western oil company and Soviet industrialists may not take place. The head of the western delegation suddenly began to demand the replacement of a representative of the USSR.

Cast 
 Lev Durov as Aleksandr  Nikolaevich Vysotin
 Aleksandr Galibin as Yuri Ivanov
 Anatoly Grachyov as  Igor Tolkunov
 Gunnar Kilgas as Clark, president of a foreign concern
 Lev Kruglyy as engineer Chernetsov
 Irina Miroshnichenko		as Inna
 Ernst Romanov as Ilya Zuev
 Vsevolod Sanaev as Oleg Maksimovich Astakhov, Deputy Minister
 Vyacheslav Tikhonov as Konstantin Pavlovich Ivanov
 Nikolay Volkov Sr. as Konstantin Ivanov's father
 Yevgeniya Khanayeva as Konstantin Ivanov's mother-in-law
 Vytautas Paukštė as Bogan

References

External links 
 

1976 films
1970s Russian-language films
Soviet drama films
1976 drama films
Lenfilm films
Films directed by Semyon Aranovich